Three referendums were held in Switzerland in 1964. The first was held on 2 February on granting a general tax amnesty, and was rejected by voters. The second was held on 24 May on a federal law on vocational education, and was approved by voters. The third was held on 6 December on continuing with price controls, and was also approved by voters.

Results

February: Tax amnesty

May: Federal law on vocational education

December: Continuing with price controls

References

1964 referendums
1964 in Switzerland
Referendums in Switzerland